Perretta is a surname. Notable people with the surname include:

Charlotte Anne Perretta (1942- 2015), American judge, first woman to sit on the Massachusetts Appeals Court
Julian Perretta (born 1992), English singer-songwriter and producer
Harry Perretta (born 1955), retired American basketball coach
Ralph Perretta (born 1953), former professional American football player

See also 

 Peretta
 Perrette

surnames